List of provinces of ancient Japan > Tōsandō > Rikuchu Province > Esashi District

 was a district located in Iwate Prefecture, Japan.

Timeline
 April 1, 1889 - Due to the municipal status enforcement, the following municipalities were formed. (1 town, 12 villages)
 The town of Iwayadō, the villages of Tawara, Fujisato, Ide, Yonesato, Tamasato, Yanagawa, Hirose, Inase, Odaki, Kuroishi and Hada (now part of the city of Ōshū)
 The village of Fukuoka (now part of the city of Kitakami)
 April 1, 1954 (1 town, 9 villages)
 The villages of Kuroishi and Hada were merged with the town of Mizusawa, and the villages of Anetai, Shinjō and Sakurakawa (all from Isawa District) to create the city of Mizusawa.
 The village of Fukuoka was merged with the town of Kurosawaji, and the villages of Iitoyo, Futago, Saraki and Oniyanagi (all from Waga District), and the village of Aisari (from Isawa District) to create the city of Kitakami.
 February 10, 1955 - The town of Iwayadō, and the villages of Tawara, Fujisato, Ide, Yonesato, Tamasato, Yanagawa, Hirose, Inase and Odaki were merged to create the town of Esashi. (1 town)
 November 3, 1958 - The town of Esashi was elevated to city status to become the city of Esashi. Esashi District was dissolved as a result of this merger.

See also

 List of dissolved districts of Japan

Former districts of Iwate Prefecture
District Esashi